The following are the national records in speed skating in Slovakia, maintained by Slovak Speed Skating Union.

Men

Women

References

External links
Slovak Speed Skating Union website

Slovakia
Speed skating-related lists
Records
Speed skating